Banzai!, officially stylized BANZAI!, is a discontinued shōnen manga anthology that was published in Germany by Carlsen Verlag, from November 2001 to December 2005. It debuted in November 2001 as a German language adaptation of the popular Japanese manga anthology Weekly Shōnen Jump, published by Shueisha. In addition to various series from Weekly Shōnen Jump, the magazine serialized some original German manga-influenced comics, including Crewman 3. Issues also included educational articles to teach readers Japanese and columns with news updates on anime and manga series. Series published in the magazine were also published in tankōbon volumes under the Banzai! präsentiert and the highly popular series under the Best of Banzai! label. The name Banzai! came from the transliteration of 10,000 years, a traditional Japanese exclamation.

Banzai! was the first German manga magazine aimed at boys. Banzai! initially circulated with 130,000 copies per period.

The magazine was discontinued in December 2005 due to Shueisha declining to renew Carlsen Verlag's license for the adaptation. The German division of Tokyopop was able to acquire the license to publish other tankōbon volumes of the Weekly Shōnen Jump magazine. The already published manga volumes from Banzai! remain under the Banzai! präsentiert line.

Series

Manga

Original works 
In addition to manga series, Banzai! included chapters from a few original German language manga-influenced comics.

See also 

 List of manga magazines published outside of Japan

References

External links
 

2001 comics debuts
2005 comics endings
2001 establishments in Germany
2005 disestablishments in Germany
Anime and manga magazines
Comics magazines published in Germany
Defunct magazines published in Germany
German-language magazines
Magazines established in 2001
Magazines disestablished in 2005
Magazines published in Hamburg
Monthly magazines published in Germany
Shōnen manga